Melaleuca minutifolia, commonly known as teatree is a plant in the myrtle family, Myrtaceae and is endemic to northern Australia.  As suggested by its name, it has tiny leaves but it also produces creamy white to white flowers throughout the year in its native range.

Description 
The leaves are arranged in alternate pairs (decussate), making four rows of leaves along the stems.

The flowers are white to creamy white and are arranged in short spikes on the ends of the branches which continue to grow after flowering or on their sides. The stamens are arranged in five bundles around the flowers with 8 to 16 stamens in each bundle.

Taxonomy and naming
The species was first formally described by Victorian Government Botanist Ferdinand von Mueller in 1859 from "barren localities in North Western Australia". The specific epithet (minutifolia) is from the Latin words minutus meaning "little" or “small” and folia meaning "leaves"  referring to the tiny leaves of this species.

Distribution and habitat
Melaleuca minutifolia occurs in sandy or rocky soils in and between the Drysdale River National Park in northern Western Australia and the south west part of Arnhem Land in the Northern Territory

Conservation
Melaleuca minutifolia is listed as "not threatened" by the Government of Western Australia Department of Parks and Wildlife.

Uses

Horticulture
This species has an informal, attractive shape and a useful screening plant for tropical climates.

Essential oils
The oil from the leaves of this species consists mainly of sesquiterpenes and monoterpenes.

References

minutifolia
Flora of the Northern Territory
Rosids of Western Australia
Myrtales of Australia
Plants described in 1859
Taxa named by Ferdinand von Mueller